is a Japanese football player. He plays for Kyoto Sanga.

Career
Kazuki Tanaka joined J1 League club FC Tokyo in 2017.

Career statistics

Club
.

Notes

References

External links

2000 births
Living people
Association football people from Tochigi Prefecture
Hosei University alumni
Japanese footballers
Association football forwards
J3 League players
FC Tokyo players
FC Tokyo U-23 players
Kyoto Sanga FC players